Hunter Patrol is a shoot 'em up written by Steve Lee for the Commodore 64 and published by Mastertronic in 1985. The music was composed by Rob Hubbard. The game is similar in style to the Sega arcade game Buck Rogers: Planet of Zoom.

Gameplay
Taking control of a WW2 airplane, the player attacks enemy installations on the ground whilst avoiding enemy planes and flak. Once a sufficient number of installations are destroyed, the level's main target appears. When this had been taken care of the player moves on to the next level with the rewards of a score bonus and an extra life.

References

External links

1985 video games
Commodore 64 games
Commodore 64-only games
Mastertronic games
Scrolling shooters
Video games scored by Rob Hubbard
Video games developed in the United Kingdom

Single-player video games